Emmesa is a genus of false darkling beetles in the family Melandryidae. There are about five described species in Emmesa.

Species
These five species belong to the genus Emmesa:
 Emmesa blackmani Hatch, 1927
 Emmesa connectens Newman, 1838
 Emmesa labiata (Say)
 Emmesa stacesmithi Hatch, 1962
 Emmesa testacea

References

Further reading

 
 

Melandryidae
Articles created by Qbugbot